Shona Doey Seawright (born 27 February 1977) is a former Irish woman cricketer. She has appeared in 7 Women's ODIs representing Irish cricket team. She was also a member of the Irish cricket team in the 1995 Women's European Cricket Cup.

References

External links 
 

1977 births
Living people
Irish women cricketers
Ireland women One Day International cricketers
People from Ballymoney
Sportspeople from County Antrim